The following article features the complete discography of the Massachusetts based melodic hardcore band A Wilhelm Scream, including their earlier releases under the names Smackin' Isaiah and Koen.

Studio albums

Extended plays

Music videos

Split albums

Cassettes

Discographies of American artists
Heavy metal group discographies
Punk rock group discographies